Earl Mullen (September 21, 1902 – June 23, 1969) was an American businessman and politician.

Born in Deerfield, Wisconsin, Mullen graduated from Deerfield High School and then went to the University of Wisconsin. Mullen was a farmer, a salesman, and then operated a barber shop in Madison, Wisconsin. Mullen served as chairman of the Town of Blooming Grove, Wisconsin Board and also served on the Dane County, Wisconsin Board of Supervisors. Mullen served in the Wisconsin State Assembly from 1943 to 1949 first as a Progressive and then in the 1947 session as a Republican. Mullen died in a hospital in Madison, Wisconsin.

Notes

1902 births
1969 deaths
People from Deerfield, Wisconsin
University of Wisconsin–Madison alumni
Businesspeople from Wisconsin
Farmers from Wisconsin
Wisconsin Progressives (1924)
Mayors of places in Wisconsin
County supervisors in Wisconsin
20th-century American businesspeople
20th-century American politicians
People from Blooming Grove, Wisconsin
Republican Party members of the Wisconsin State Assembly